Screamadelica Live is a Primal Scream live album and DVD, It was released in 2011 for Primal Scream's tour for the 20th anniversary for the 1991 album Screamadelica. The performance was filmed at the Olympia Grand Hall in London on 26 November 2010 and was released on CD, DVD and Blu-ray on 30 May 2011. This is the final Primal Scream album to feature Mani, who departed and reformed his previous band The Stone Roses in the same year.

Track listing

Setlist
 "Accelerator"
 "Country Girl"
 "Jailbird"
 "Burning Wheel"
 "Suicide Bomb"
 "Shoot Speed / Kill Light"
 "Swastika Eyes"
 "Rocks"
 "Kowalski"
Screamdelica 
 "Movin' on Up"
 "Slip Inside This House"
 "Don't Fight It, Feel It"
 "Damaged"
 "I'm Comin' Down"
 "Shine Like Stars"
 "Inner Flight"
 "Higher Than the Sun"
 "Loaded"
 "Come Together"

Primal Scream
 Bobby Gillespie - vocals
 Andrew Innes - guitars, synthesizers
 Barrie Cadogan - guitars
 Gary Mounfield - bass
 Martin Duffy - keyboards, synthesizers, samples, programming, turntables, effects
 Darrin Mooney - drums, percussion

Charts

Weekly charts

References

Primal Scream albums
2011 live albums